The Copper Ridge Dolomite is a geologic formation in Alabama. It preserves fossils dating back to the Cambrian Period.

See also
 List of fossiliferous stratigraphic units in Alabama
 Paleontology in Alabama

References

 Fossilworks data page

Cambrian Alabama
Cambrian West Virginia